Jabberwocky is a progressive rock album released in 1999 by British keyboardists Clive Nolan and Oliver Wakeman.  It was the first of two albums released by the duo.

In 2021 it was remastered along with The Hound of the Baskervilles as part of the box set Tales by Gaslight. This also included Dark Fables, an album of previously unreleased songs plus the original recording of Rick Wakeman reading the poem "Jabberwocky". The remastering process added two guitar solos, one on each album, that had been planned for the original recordings but overlooked.

When consulted on the artwork for box set, Jabberwocky cover artist Rodney Matthews pointed out that the image had been reversed on the original album cover, booklet and poster, so the correct orientation was restored on the box set version.

Plot
The album is based on the homonymous poem by Lewis Carroll.  It is organised as a cantata, with four singers taking the main roles of The Boy, The Girl, The Jabberwock and The Tree, plus a narrator who reads excerpts of the original poem and a choir that sings fragments taken from the Divina Commedia.

Track listing
(All songs written by Clive Nolan and Oliver Wakeman)

Overture - 5:57
Coming to Town - 2:55
Dangerous World - 6:54
The Forest - 4:22
A Glimmer of Light - 2:42
Shadows - 4:19
Enlightenment - 5:23
Dancing Water - 4:12
The Burgundy Rose - 3:55
The Mission - 4:32
Call to Arms - 6:37
Finale - 1:50

Personnel
 Bob Catley as The Boy
 Tracy Hitchings as The Girl
 James Plumridge as The Jabberwock
 Paul Allison as The Tree
 Pete Gee - Fretless Bass
 Clive Nolan - Keyboards
 Oliver Wakeman - Keyboards
 Ian Salmon - Guitar & Bass
 Peter Banks - Guitars
 Jon Jeary - Acoustic Guitar
 Tony Fernandez - Drums
 Rick Wakeman - The Narrator
 Michelle Young, Michelle Gulrajani, Suzanne Chenery, Tracy Hitchings, Sian Roberts, John Jowitt, Dave Wagstaffe, Donald Morrison, Ian Gould, John Mitchell, Tina Riley & Clive Nolan - The Choir

Additional personnel
 David Mark Pearce - additional guitar on "The Burgundy Rose" (2021 remaster only)

Technical
 Clive Nolan & Karl Groom - Producers and Engineers
 Matt Goodluck - Design & Layour
 Rodney Matthews - Artwork

References

External links
Jabberwocky at progarchives.com

1999 albums
Progressive rock albums by British artists
Concept albums
Albums with cover art by Rodney Matthews
Adaptations of works by Lewis Carroll
Jabberwocky